is a professional Go player.

Biography 
Kato became a professional in 1990, and in the same year was promoted to 2 dan. In 1996, he had already reached 6 dan, and became 9 dan in 2011. As an insei, he was taught by Yasuro Kikuchi. Kato has been part of the Kisei league consistently for the last few years.

Promotion record

References

Living people
1974 births
Japanese Go players